Silhouettella is a genus of spiders in the family Oonopidae. It was first described in 1979 by Benoit. , it contains 11 species.

Species
Silhouettella comprises the following species:
 Silhouettella betalfa Saaristo, 2007 — Israel
 Silhouettella curieusei Benoit, 1979 (type) — Seychelles, Madagascar
 Silhouettella loricatula (Roewer, 1942) — Europe to Central Asia, North Africa, Canary Is.
 Silhouettella osmaniye Wunderlich, 2011 — Turkey, Azerbaijan
 Silhouettella perisalma Álvarez-Padilla, Ubick & Griswold, 2015 — Madagascar
 Silhouettella perismontes Álvarez-Padilla, Ubick & Griswold, 2015 — Madagascar
 Silhouettella saaristoi Ranasinghe & Benjamin, 2018 — Sri Lanka
 Silhouettella snippy Ranasinghe & Benjamin, 2018 — Sri Lanka
 Silhouettella tiggy Ranasinghe & Benjamin, 2018 — Sri Lanka
 Silhouettella tomer Saaristo, 2007 — Israel
 Silhouettella usgutra Saaristo & van Harten, 2002 — Yemen (Socotra)

References

Oonopidae
Araneomorphae genera
Spiders of Asia
Spiders of Africa